Hanna Śleszyńska (born 11 April 1959 in Warsaw) is a Polish film, television and theater actress.

She is best known for playing the role of cousin Jadzia in Polish TV series Rodzina zastępcza (Foster Family) and sister Genowefa Basen in Daleko od noszy (English Off the Stretcher).

Biography 
In 1982 she graduated the Aleksander Zelwerowicz State Theatre Academy of Warsaw. Her first theater performance was in Niebo zawiedzionych (Sky of the Disappointed) of Bertolt Brecht directed by Lena Szurmiej on the stage of the Ateneum Theatre.

In 2005 she participated in the show Taniec z gwiazdami (Dancing with the Stars). Her dance partner was Michał Szuba. They took the 9th place.

Personal life 
She was in a relationship with Piotr Gąsowski. They were a couple for several years. She is now in a relationship with Jacek Brzosko.

Selected filmography

Actress 
 1980: Lęk przestrzeni as Dorota
 1995: Awantura o Basię (Argument About Basia) as Marcysia
 1997: Boża podszewka as Józia Jurewicz
 2000: Graczykowie as Barbara Oberman
 2001–2003: Szpital na perypetiach as sister Genowefa Basen
 2001–2009: Rodzina zastępcza (Foster Family) as cousin Jadzia
 2002: Plebania as Alina Bednarkowa, mother of Renata and Marek
 2003–2011: Daleko od noszy (English Off the Stretcher) as sister Genowefa Basen
 2007: Ja wam pokażę! as Jagoda
 2009: Grzeszni i bogaci (Sins of Love) as Rołz
 2009: Magiczne drzewo as aunt Maryla Gruber

 Dubbing in Polish 
 2004: The Incredibles as Malina
 2008: Fly Me to the Moon'' as Nadia

External links 

Official profile in Filmpolski.pl database

1959 births
Polish film actresses
Polish television actresses
Actresses from Warsaw
Polish stage actresses
20th-century Polish actresses
Polish voice actresses
Living people